Jinchengjiang is a district and the seat of Hechi, Guangxi, People's Republic of China.

Administrative divisions
Jinchengjiang District is divided into 1 subdistrict, 7 towns, and 4 townships:

The only subdistrict is Jinchengjiang Subdistrict (金城江街道)

Towns:
Dongjiang (东江镇), Liuxu (六圩镇), Liujia (六甲镇), Hechi Town (河池镇), Bagong (拔贡镇), Jiuxu (九圩镇), Wuxu (五圩镇)

Townships:
Baitu Township (白土乡), Celing Township (侧岭乡), Baoping Township (保平乡), Changlao Township (长老乡)

Transportation
 Hechi Jinchengjiang Airport
 Guizhou–Guangxi Railway (Jinchengjiang railway station)

References

External links

County-level divisions of Guangxi
Administrative divisions of Hechi